Vexillum millecostatum is a species of small sea snail, marine gastropod mollusk in the family Costellariidae, the ribbed miters.

Description

Distribution

References

External links
 W.O.Cernohorsky, The Mitridae of Fiji - The Veliger v. 8 (1965-1966)

millecostatum
Gastropods described in 1836
Taxa named by William Broderip